Ziggo Sport Totaal is a Dutch premium television service operated by Ziggo and owned by VodafoneZiggo, a joint venture between Liberty Global and Vodafone. Ziggo Sport Totaal launched as Sport1 with  its sister service Film1 on 1 February 2006 and replaced the Canal+ Netherlands channels. Film1 was sold to Sony Pictures Television on 21 July 2015, while Sport1 remained Liberty Global-owned. At launch the service consisted of two main channels, six extra channels and one HD simulcast of the first main channel. On 2 February 2009 the number of extra channels was reduced to four. The extra channels only broadcast when necessary to live broadcast multiple sport events at the same time. The service was rebranded to Ziggo Sport Totaal on 12 November 2015.

The channels are available on digital cable of most Dutch cable companies. Satellite provider Canal Digitaal only provides three channels.

Channels
 Ziggo Sport Select: The primary channel
 Ziggo Sport Voetbal: Football channel
 Ziggo Sport Golf: Golf channel
 Ziggo Sport Racing: Racing channel
 Ziggo Sport Docu: Sports Documentary channel
 Ziggo Sport Tennis: Tennis channel
 Ziggo Sport On Demand: Sports highlights on-demand S-VOD service
 Ziggo Sport Totaal Go: Live app

Ziggo Sport, which offers live broadcasts of major sporting events is exclusive to Ziggo subscribers and not included with Ziggo Sport Totaal. However, Ziggo Sport and Ziggo Sport Select normally have the same programming.

Coverage

Football
 UEFA Champions League 2016 - 2027
 UEFA Europa League 2024 - 2027
 UEFA Conference League 2024 - 2027
 UEFA Super Cup
 UEFA Youth League
 UEFA Women's Champions League
 UEFA Nations League Top games live except Dutch National Team Group stage matches
 English FA Cup
 Spanish La Liga At least six matches per round live; all matches of Real Madrid CF and FC Barcelona live
 Copa del Rey
 Supercopa de España
 Ligue 1
 Italian Serie A 
 Coppa Italia
 Süper Lig
 Belgian Pro League Top Matches only
 Beker van België
 Portuguese Primeira Liga Only top matches and important matches live including Benfica, FC Porto & Sporting CP
 Scottish Premiership Only Old Firm and important matches live including Celtic & Rangers

Tennis
 Wimbledon Live except Dutch players
 ATP World Tour Masters 1000 Live
 ATP World Tour 500 Live
 ATP World Tour 250 Live
 ATP World Tour Finals Live
 WTA 1000 Live
 WTA 500 Live
 WTA 250 Live
 WTA Finals Live
 Davis Cup Live
 Billie Jean King Cup Live

Motorsport
 MotoGP, Moto2 and Moto3
 Porsche Supercup Race only with preview show
 W Series Qualifying and Race
 IMSA
 IndyCar Series
 NASCAR Cup Series, Xfinity Series, Camping World Truck Series and Whelen Euro Series (Highlights only)
 World RX
 European Formula 3 Championship
 DTM, Porsche Carrera Cup Germany and Audi Sport TT Cup
 ADAC GT Masters
 Ferrari Challenge Europe
 24 Hours Nürburgring
 Monza Rally Show (Highlights only)
 V8 Supercars
 Formula E Qualifying and race
 European Truck Racing Championship

Motorsport news programs
 GP Confidential
 The Inside Line

Golf
 The Masters Tournament
 European Tour
 PGA Tour
 World Golf Championships
 Presidents Cup

See also
 Television in the Netherlands
 Ziggo
 Ziggo Sport

References

External links
 ziggosporttotaal.nl 

Liberty Global
Vodafone
Television channels in the Netherlands
Television channels and stations established in 2006